The Polytechnical Institute of Beja (Instituto Politécnico de Beja) is a state-run polytechnic institute of higher education, comprising several schools. It is located in Beja, on the south region of Alentejo, Portugal. It was established in 1979 and has about 3,500  students (as of 2007).

Schools 

ESAB - Escola Superior Agrária de Beja
ESEB - Escola Superior de Educação de Beja
ESTIG - Escola Superior de Tecnologia e Gestão de Beja
ESSB - Escola Superior de Saúde de Beja

See also
Higher education in Portugal

External links
Instituto Politécnico de Beja

Polytechnics in Portugal
Educational institutions established in 1979
1979 establishments in Portugal
Education in Beja, Portugal